Relee is an unincorporated community in Coffee County, in the U.S. state of Georgia.

History
The community was named after Robert E. Lee (1807–1870), an American Civil War general.

References

Unincorporated communities in Coffee County, Georgia
Unincorporated communities in Georgia (U.S. state)